Erwin Waldner (24 January 1933 – 18 April 2015) was a German footballer.

Club career 
He was one of not that many West German players in the early 1960s who played his club football abroad. After spells at FC Zürich in Switzerland and Real SPAL in Italy he returned to his former club VfB Stuttgart in 1963 with the introduction of the Bundesliga.

International career 
Waldner won 13 caps between December 1954 and December 1958 for the West German national team.

Honours
VfB Stuttgart
 DFB-Pokal: 1953–54 and 1957–58

References

External links 
  
 
 
 
 Erwin Waldner at kicker.de 

1933 births
2015 deaths
German footballers
Association football forwards
Germany international footballers
VfB Stuttgart players
FC Zürich players
S.P.A.L. players
Bundesliga players
Swiss Super League players
Serie A players
People from Nürtingen
Sportspeople from Stuttgart (region)
Footballers from Baden-Württemberg
West German footballers
West German expatriate sportspeople in Italy
West German expatriate sportspeople in Switzerland
West German expatriate footballers
Expatriate footballers in Italy
Expatriate footballers in Switzerland